Chaetodactylidae is a family of mites in the order Sarcoptiformes. There are five genera: Sennertia, Chaetodactylus, Achaetodactylus, Centriacarus, and Roubikia.

References

Further reading

 
 
 
 
 
 
 

 Chaetodactylus_krombeini
 bugguide.net. Family Chaetodactylidae

Acariformes
Acari families